Aroa is the capital of the municipality of Bolívar in the state of Yaracuy, Venezuela.
It grew up to serve the Aroa copper mines, now defunct.

Location

The climate is warm and humid, and the area is covered in thick forest.

History

Mining began in 1632, following gold veins, which led to discovery of large deposits of copper.
Around the end of the 17th century the "Cobre Caracas" mining company became the property of the family of Simón Bolívar (1783–1830).
The largest of the mines, La Vizcaina, was worked by 60 to 70 slaves.
In 1824 Bolivar leased the mines to British entrepreneurs.
The British employed about 1,200 workers in the mines, including British and Venezuelans.
They used the Aroa River to carry the ore by barge to the coast, where it was loaded onto ships.

A narrow gauge line from Aroa to the port of Tucacas was opened in 1877.
The Ferrocarril Bolívar was the first railway in Venezuela.
Also in 1877 the road from Barquisimeto to Aroa was upgraded so it could be used by wagons and carts.
In 1891 the railway was extended from Aroa via Duaca to Barquisimeto.
Aroa was the first town in the country to obtain electricity and telephone service.
A cableway was built linking the mines to the town.
The mines were abandoned in 1936.
The  Parque Minas de Aroa (Aroa Mines Park) was created on 21 September 1974, containing the old mine workings.

Notes

Sources

Yaracuy